is an urban expressway in Nagoya, Japan. It is a part of the Nagoya Expressway network and is owned and operated by Nagoya Expressway Public Corporation.

Overview

The route extends northward from its junction with the Ring Route and continues until its junction with the Higashi-Meihan Expressway. It is 4 lanes for its entire length and was built as an elevated expressway above the median of National Route 41. The first section of the route was opened to traffic in 1988 and the entire route was completed in 1995.

NEX Plaza, an information center run by Nagoya Expressway Public Corporation, is sandwiched in the middle of a looping ramp that makes up part of Kurokawa Interchange.

Interchange list

 JCT - junction, TB - toll gate

References

External links
 Nagoya Expressway Public Corporation

Nagoya Expressway